La Llorona, also known as The Weeping Woman, is a 2019 Guatemalan horror film directed by Jayro Bustamante.

Plot
Former Guatemalan dictator Enrique Monteverde (based on Efraín Ríos Montt) is being tried for orchestrating the brutal genocide of native Mayans in 1982–83. Now elderly, he lives with his wife, Carmen; daughter, Natalia; granddaughter, Sara and their security guard, Letona. During the trial, Natalia is troubled by the indigenous women who describe being brutalized by Monteverde's army, while Carmen dismisses them as liars. He is convicted but the verdict is overturned by the high court, which ruled that his guilt could not be conclusively proven. The decision is met with disgust and unrest by the public, who hold nonstop protests outside Monteverde's home.

Monteverde's sleep is interrupted by the sound of a woman weeping and he narrowly misses shooting his wife in the kitchen. This leads to most of his household staff — who are ethnic Kaqchikel people — quitting. His devoted housekeeper, Valeriana, brings in a young woman named Alma from her village to work as a maid. Supernatural activity involving water, including faucets spontaneously turning on, ensues. One night Monteverde sees Alma wading through the pool into the house; his family discovers him, sexually aroused, watching Alma wash her dress. His disgusted wife tells Natalia that he was always attracted to native women and reveals her suspicions that Valeriana, who arrived at their household as a child, may be his daughter. However, Natalia learns from Sara that even though she is very young, Alma already had a son and daughter who died. Alma teaches Sara to hold her breath under water.

The protests continue around the clock, leaving the family essentially trapped in the house. Carmen wets the bed during recurring nightmares where she pictures herself as a Kaqchikel woman being chased and abducted with two Kaqchikel children by the military. The house is blanketed with flyers of the disappeared from decades earlier; Sara and Alma notice one of the Kaqchikel men on the flyers is among the crowd of protesters. Suspicion grows within Valeriana when she reveals to Alma that nobody in her village appears to know her.

Valeriana suspects dark magic is at work and attempts to cleanse Monteverde of the evil spirit. Later that night, Sara uses her grandfather’s oxygen cylinder to hold her breath longer under the pool. Terrified, Monteverde starts shooting Alma while accidentally shooting Sara in the arm. The house is surrounded by the spirits of the disappeared. As he searches around the house, Letona encounters the spirits of two Kaqchikel children who calmly take him away and is not seen again. Valeriana performs a Mayan ceremony while a woman's wailing can be heard. Carmen goes into a trance as she is transported back to the nightmare, which are revealed to be Alma's last moments, watching her children drowned by soldiers before being executed herself by Monteverde. A distraught Carmen strangles Monteverde in the trance and in reality.

At Monteverde's funeral, another old general excuses to the bathroom where he hears a woman wailing as the room begins to flood.

Cast
 María Mercedes Coroy as Alma
 Margarita Kenéfic as Carmen
 Sabrina De La Hoz as Natalia
 Julio Díaz as Enrique Monteverde
 María Telón as Valeriana
 Ayla-Elea Hurtado as Sara
 Juan Pablo Olyslager as Letona

Release
La Llorona had its world premiere on 30 August 2019 at the Venice Film Festival (Giornate degli Autori) and later screened in the Contemporary World Cinema section at the 2019 Toronto International Film Festival. It was selected as the Guatemalan entry for the Best International Feature Film at the 93rd Academy Awards, making the shortlist of 15 films. On 6 August 2020, the film premiered on the horror streaming service Shudder. On October 18th, 2022, the film was released by the Criterion Collection on Blu-ray and DVD.

Reception
Critical reception for La Llorona has been positive. The website's critical consensus reads "La Llorona puts a fresh spin on the familiar legend by blending the supernatural and the political to resolutely chilling effect." On Metacritic the film holds a weighted average score of 79 out of 100 based on 14 critic reviews, indicating "generally favorable reviews".

La Llorona received praise from Katie Rife from The A.V. Club, who felt that the film offered "a more intelligent spin on the legend than last year’s schlocky The Curse Of La Llorona". She praised its direction, visual style and story which "layers elements of class, race, and gender conflict on top of creeping horror atmosphere", but criticized its pacing which "slows to a crawl, as Bustamante delves into inter-familial dynamics that are interesting but ultimately a distraction from a more satisfying tale of supernatural revenge."

Manohla Dargis from The New York Times described the film as "a thoughtful, low-key Guatemalan movie that deploys its genre shocks inside a sober art-house package". She noted that "its early scenes — with their mannered delivery and narrative ellipses — are right out of the modern art-film stylebook", reminding her of Lucrecia Martel's style. She added "With precise framing, compositional flair and a steady hand, Bustamante layers the story, adding daubs that suggest rather than explain."

Monica Castillo from RogerEbert.com awarded it 3 stars out of 4, stating that "La Llorona is filled with bewitching imagery and tension, even if it’s less full of surprises and jump scares than other horror movies. Bustamante uses the old haunted tale not to scare us, but to force his audience to reflect on the ways they are complicit in oppression."

Meagan Navarro from Bloody Disgusting awarded it 2½ skulls out of 5, writing "Bustamante delivers a sobering evocation for justice, and in the case of La Llorona, it’s by the hands of a folkloric vengeance seeker. Certain aspects of the story are emotionally powerful, while other threads feel underdeveloped. The predictability of the overarching direction means the slow-burn pacing can drag, and the horror elements are very minimal. If you go in expecting something more historically relevant and genre adjacent, it’s easier to find an in to a narrative that's not always easily accessible."

See also
 2019 Toronto International Film Festival
 List of submissions to the 93rd Academy Awards for Best International Feature Film
 List of Guatemalan submissions for the Academy Award for Best International Feature Film

References

External links
 

2019 films
2019 drama films
Guatemalan drama films
Guatemalan Civil War
Films about genocide
Films directed by Jayro Bustamante
Mayan-language films
2010s Spanish-language films
La Llorona
2019 independent films
South American horror films